Sintana is a large crater in the southern hemisphere of the dwarf planet Ceres, located at 44.21° S, 76.4 ° E. It has a diameter of 58 km. The crater is named after the deity of the Kogi people of northern Colombia who produced fertile black earth. It was officially named by the IAU on July 3, 2015.

References

Impact craters on asteroids
Surface features of Ceres